The Brabazon Range ( Brabazon Mountains ) is a mountain range located in the U.S. state of Alaska in Saint Elias Mountains in Tongass National Forest. The Brabazon Range stretches for about 28 miles from Alsek River at Gateway Knob to Harlequin Lake, located 44 miles southeast of Yakutat in south central Alaska. It is situated to the southeast of Mount Reaburn (1684 m) and northeast of Square Lake Cabin and north of Bear Island.

The name for the mountain ranger was first proposed by then University of Wisconsin geologist, Eliot Blackwelder. It is named after A. J. Brabazon, who created the first topographic map of the ranger in 1895.

References

Mountains of Unorganized Borough, Alaska
Mountains of Yakutat City and Borough, Alaska
Saint Elias Mountains